The 2007 National Indoor Football League season was the seventh and final season of the National Indoor Football League (NIFL). The 2007 season was chaotic with teams folding and being suspended.

Standings

team was suspended from league mid-season

Postseason 

The San Diego Shockwave was declared the league champion.

External links

National Indoor Football League seasons
National Indoor Football League Season, 2007